Vojsko is a settlement in the Municipality of Kozje in eastern Slovenia. The area is part of the traditional region of Styria. The municipality is now included in the Savinja Statistical Region.

References

External links
Vojsko on Geopedia

Populated places in the Municipality of Kozje